Stefan Plath (born 1970) is a Swedish politician of the Sweden Democrats party who became a member of the Riksdag in 2021. 

He represents the Malmö Municipality and was appointed as a replacement for Sara Gille who was on temporary leave before becoming a full-time member of parliament. Before entering politics he was a systems administrator and then an IT consultant in Sweden and Denmark. He has also served as a municipal councilor for the SD in Malmö. In parliament, he served as a member of the civil liberties and foreign affairs committees.

References 

1970 births
Living people
Members of the Riksdag from the Sweden Democrats
People from Malmö Municipality